

Deaths in February

 1: Jim McWithey
 2: Paul Birch

Current sporting seasons

Auto racing 2008

Sprint Cup

Nationwide Series
Camping World Truck Series
A1 Grand Prix
GP2 Asia Series

Speedcar Series

Rolex Sports Car Series

Basketball 2008–09
NBA
American competitions:
NCAA men
NCAA women
Pan-European competitions:
Euroleague
Eurocup
EuroChallenge
Australia
Greece
Iran
Israel
Italy
Philippines

Spain
Spanish second division
Turkey

Cricket 2008–09

Football (soccer)
2008–09
2010 FIFA World Cup Qualifying
UEFA (Europe) Champions League
UEFA Cup
Copa Libertadores (South America)
CONCACAF (North & Central America) Champions League
OFC (Oceania) Champions League
AFC (Asia) Champions League
CAF (Africa) Champions League
England
Germany
Iran
Italy
Spain
France
Argentina

Golf 2009
European Tour
PGA Tour
LPGA Tour

Ice hockey 2008–09
National Hockey League
Kontinental Hockey League

Rugby league 2009
Super League

Rugby union 2008–09
Heineken Cup
English Premiership
Celtic League
Top 14
Super 14
Sevens World Series

Winter sports
Alpine Skiing World Cup
Biathlon World Cup
Cross-Country Skiing World Cup
Freestyle Skiing World Cup
Nordic Combined World Cup
Ski Jumping World Cup
Snowboard World Cup
Speed Skating World Cup

Days of the month

28 February 2009 (Saturday)

Auto racing
Nationwide Series:
Sam's Town 300 in Las Vegas, Nevada
(1) Greg Biffle  (2) Carl Edwards  (3) Brian Vickers

Cricket
England in West Indies:
4th Test in Bridgetown, Barbados, day 3:
 600/6d;  398/5 (Ramnaresh Sarwan 184*). West Indies trail by 202 runs with 5 wickets remaining in the first innings.
Australia in South Africa:
1st Test in Johannesburg, day 3:
 466 and 51/1;  220 (AB de Villiers 104*). Australia led by 297 runs with 9 wickets remaining.

Football (soccer)
A-League Grand Final in Melbourne:
Melbourne Victory 1–0 Adelaide United
Victory win their second A-League Grand Final thanks to a 60th-minute strike from Tom Pondeljak.

Rugby union
Six Nations Championship, week 3:
 26–6  in Edinburgh
Ireland 14–13  in Dublin
Ireland score its third win and lead the standings on 6 points, ahead of France and Wales with 4 points.

Tennis
ATP Tour:
Dubai Tennis Championships in Dubai, United Arab Emirates:
Final:  Novak Djokovic def.  David Ferrer 7–5, 6–3
Abierto Mexicano Telcel in Acapulco, Mexico:
Final:  Nicolás Almagro def.  Gaël Monfils, 6–4, 6–4
Almagro successfully defends his title from last year.
WTA Tour:
Abierto Mexicano Telcel in Acapulco, Mexico:
Final:  Venus Williams def.  Flavia Pennetta 6–1, 6–2
Venus Williams wins two tournaments in successive weeks.

Winter sports

Alpine skiing
Women's World Cup in Bansko, Bulgaria:
downhill: (1) Andrea Fischbacher  1:45.81 (2) Tina Maze  1:46.07 (3) Fabienne Suter  1:46.20
World Cup overall standings (after 27 of 34 races): (1) Lindsey Vonn  1456 points (2) Maria Riesch  1120 (3) Anja Pärson  960
World Cup downhill standings (after 6 of 7 races): (1) Vonn 410 points (2) Dominique Gisin  291 (3) Fischbacher 281
Vonn secures the World Cup downhill title.
Men's World Cup in Kranjska Gora, Slovenia:
Giant slalom: (1) Ted Ligety  2:19.92 (2) Didier Cuche  2:20.11 (3) Massimiliano Blardone  2:20.26
World Cup overall standings (after 30 of 38 races): (1) Ivica Kostelic  813 points (2) Benjamin Raich  785 (3) Jean Baptiste Grange  775

Cross-country skiing
Nordic World Ski Championships in Liberec, Czech Republic:
30 km Freestyle Mass Start women: (1) Justyna Kowalczyk  1:16:10.6 (2) Yevgeniya Medvedeva  1:16:19.4 (3) Valentina Shevchenko  1:16:19.9
Kowalczyk wins her second title of the championships.

Figure skating
World Junior Championships in Sofia, Bulgaria:
Ladies: (1) Alena Leonova  157.18 points (2) Caroline Zhang  154.67 (3) Ashley Wagner  153.57.

Nordic combined
Nordic World Ski Championships in Liberec, Czech Republic:
Gundersen HS134/10.0 km men: (1) Bill Demong  23mins 36.6secs (8) (2) Bjoern Kircheisen  at 12.8 (7) (3) Jason Lamy-Chappuis  31.4 (1)

Skeleton
World Championships at Lake Placid, New York, United States:
Men: (1) Gregor Staehli  2.46.58 (2) Adam Pengilly  +0.35 (3) Aleksandr Tretyakov  +0.51

Ski jumping
Nordic World Ski Championships in Liberec, Czech Republic:
Team HS134 men: (1)  1034.3 points (Wolfgang Loitzl, Martin Koch, Thomas Morgenstern, Gregor Schlierenzauer) (2)  1000.8 (Anders Bardal, Tom Hilde, Johan Remen Evensen, Anders Jacobsen) (3)  981.2 (Shohhei Tochimoto, Takanobu Okabe, Daiki Ito, Noriaki Kasai)

Snowboarding
World Cup in Sunday River, United States:
Snowboardcross men: (1) Graham Watanabe  (2) Lukas Grüner  (3) Ross Powers 
Snowboardcross women: (1) Maëlle Ricker  (2) Helene Olafsen  (3) Mellie Francon

27 February 2009 (Friday)

Cricket
England in West Indies:
4th Test in Bridgetown, Barbados, day 2:
 600/6d (Ravi Bopara 104, Paul Collingwood 96);  85/1. West Indies trail by 515 runs with 9 wickets remaining in the first innings.
Australia in South Africa:
1st Test in Johannesburg, day 2:
 466 (Marcus North 117);  85/3. South Africa trail by 381 runs with 7 wickets remaining in the first innings.
India in New Zealand:
2nd Twenty20 in Wellington:
 149/6 (20/20 ov);  150/5 (20/20 ov). New Zealand win by 5 wickets on the last ball and win the series 2–0.

Rugby union
Six Nations Championship, week 3:
 21–16  in Paris
In the tournament's first ever Friday night match, France rallied from ten points behind to stop Wales' winning streak at eight matches, and inflict coach Warren Gatland's first defeat as Welsh head coach.

Winter sports

Alpine skiing
Women's World Cup in Bansko, Bulgaria:
downhill: (1) Fabienne Suter  1:45.68 (2) Andrea Fischbacher  1:46.83 (3) Nadia Fanchini  & Lindsey Vonn  1:46.92
Overall World Cup standings (after 26 of 34 races): (1) Vonn 1434 points (2) Maria Riesch  1088 (3) Anja Pärson  960

Cross-country skiing
Nordic World Ski Championships in Liberec, Czech Republic:
4x10 km Relay men: (1)  (Eldar Rønning, Odd-Bjørn Hjelmeset, Tore Ruud Hofstad, Petter Northug) 1-hour 41mins 50.6secs, (2)  (Jens Filbrich, Tobias Angerer, Franz Göring, Axel Teichmann) at 2.6secs, (3)  (Matti Heikkinen, Sami Jauhojärvi, Teemu Kattilakoski, Ville Nousiainen) 43.9

Figure skating
World Junior Championships in Sofia, Bulgaria:
Ice dancing: (1) Madison Chock/Greg Zuerlein  172.55 points (2) Maia Shibutani/Alex Shibutani  162.15 (3) Ekaterina Riazanova/Jonathan Guerreiro  161.80

Skeleton
World Championships at Lake Placid, New York, United States:
Women: (1) Marion Trott  3:47.97 (2) Amy Williams  +0.59 (3) Kerstin Szymkowiak  +0.64

Ski jumping
Nordic World Ski Championships in Liberec, Czech Republic:
HS134 men: (1) Andreas Küttel  141.3 points (133.5m) (2) Martin Schmitt  140.9 (133.0) (3) Anders Jacobsen  139.5 (132.5)
The competition is reduced to one jump only due to bad weather.

26 February 2009 (Thursday)

Basketball
Euroleague Top 16, week 4:
Group E:
Olympiacos  84–71  Asseco Prokom Sopot
Olympiacos and TAU Cerámica lead the group on 3–1. Sopot (0–4) is eliminated from quarterfinals contention.
Group F:
Maccabi Tel Aviv  69–73  Real Madrid
Real Madrid (4–0) score its first win in Tel Aviv in 13 years and advance to the quarterfinals. Maccabi is 0–5 against Spanish teams this season.
ALBA Berlin  57–75  Regal FC Barcelona
Barcelona (3–1) is on the brink of qualifying to the quarterfinals, while ALBA (0–4) is eliminated.
Group G:
Lottomatica Roma  71–90  Panathinaikos
Panathinaikos (4–0) and Partizan (3–1) advance to the quarterfinals, while Roma and Málaga are eliminated.

Cricket
England in West Indies:
4th Test in Bridgetown, Barbados, day 1:
 301/3 (Andrew Strauss 142, Alastair Cook 94)
Australia in South Africa:
1st Test in Johannesburg, day 1:
 254/5 (Ricky Ponting 83)

Football (soccer)
UEFA Cup Round of 32, second leg:(Teams in bold advance to the last-16 round; first leg score in parentheses)
CSKA Moscow  2–0 (1–1)  Aston Villa
Metalist Kharkiv  2–0 (1–0)  Sampdoria
Hamburg  1–0 (3–0)  NEC
Twente  0–1(AET) (1–0)  Marseille
Marseille wins 7–6 on penalties.
Wolfsburg  1–3 (0–2)  Paris Saint-Germain
Galatasaray  4–3 (0–0)  Bordeaux
Stuttgart  1–2 (1–2)  Zenit St. Petersburg
Milan  2–2 (1–1)  Werder Bremen
Bremen win on away goals.
Standard Liège  1–1 (0–3)  Braga
Udinese  2–1 (2–2)  Lech Poznań
Manchester City  2–1 (2–2)  Copenhagen
Ajax  1–1 (1–0)  Fiorentina
Saint-Étienne  2–1 (3–1)  Olympiacos
Deportivo  1–3 (0–3)  Aalborg BK
Tottenham Hotspur  1–1 (0–2)  Shakhtar Donetsk
Valencia  2–2 (1–1)  Dynamo Kyiv
Dynamo win on away goals.
Copa Libertadores group stage:
Group 5:
Estudiantes  1–0  Universitario de Sucre
Group 8:
San Luis  0–1  Libertad
CONCACAF Champions League Quarterfinals, first leg:
Puerto Rico Islanders  2–1  Marathón

Winter sports

Cross-country skiing
Nordic World Ski Championships in Liberec, Czech Republic:
4x5 km Relay women: (1)  (Pirjo Muranen, Virpi Kuitunen, Riitta-Liisa Roponen, Aino-Kaisa Saarinen) 54mins 24.3seconds (2)  (Katrin Zeller, Evi Sachenbacher-Stehle, Miriam Gössner, Claudia Künzel-Nystad) at 13.0 (3)  (Lina Andersson, Britta Norgren, Anna Haag, Charlotte Kalla) 13.4
Saarinen wins her third title and fourth medal of the championships.

Figure skating
World Junior Championships in Sofia, Bulgaria:
Men: (1) Adam Rippon  222.00 (2) Michal Březina  204.88 (3) Artem Grigoriev  184.40

Nordic combined
Nordic World Ski Championships in Liberec, Czech Republic:
Team HS134/4x5 km men: (1)  48mins 32.3secs (Yusuke Minato, Taihei Kato, Akito Watabe, Norihito Kobayashi) (2)  at 0.1 (Ronny Ackermann, Eric Frenzel, Björn Kircheisen, Tino Edelmann) (3)  3.6 (Mikko Kokslien, Petter Tande, Jan Schmid, Magnus Moan)

Snowboarding
World Cup in Sunday River, United States:
Parallel GS men: (1) Benjamin Karl  (2) Siegfried Grabner  (3) Jasey Jay Anderson 
Parallel GS women: (1) Amelie Kober  (2) Tomoka Takeuchi  (3) Alexa Loo

25 February 2009 (Wednesday)

Basketball
Euroleague Top 16, week 4:
Group E:
AJ Milano  74–107  TAU Cerámica
Group G:
Unicaja Málaga  74–78 (OT)  Partizan Igokea
Group H:
CSKA Moscow  95–71  Montepaschi Siena
Fenerbahçe Ülker  64–86  Cibona Zagreb

Cricket
Sri Lanka in Pakistan:
1st Test in Karachi, day 5:
 644/7d & 144/5 (Kumar Sangakkara 65);  765/6d (Younis Khan 313). Match drawn.
India in New Zealand:
1st Twenty20 in Christchurch:
 162/8 (Suresh Raina 61*);  166/3 (18.5 ov) (Brendon McCullum 56*). New Zealand win by 7 wickets and lead the 2-match Twenty20 series 1–0.

Football (soccer)
Champions League First knockout round, first leg:
Chelsea  1–0  Juventus
Villarreal  1–1  Panathinaikos
Sporting Lisbon  0–5  Bayern Munich
Real Madrid  0–1  Liverpool
Copa Libertadores group stage:
Group 5:
Deportivo Quito  1–1  Cruzeiro
Group 6:
Caracas  3–1  Lanús
Guadalajara  6–2  Everton
Group 7:
Grêmio  0–0  Universidad de Chile
CONCACAF Champions League Quarterfinals, first leg:
Montreal Impact  2–0  Santos Laguna
Cruz Azul  1–0  UNAM

Winter sports

Cross-country skiing
Nordic World Ski Championships in Liberec, Czech Republic:
1.3 km Classic Team Sprint women: (1)  (Aino-Kaisa Saarinen/Virpi Kuitunen) 19mins 43.7secs (2)  (Anna Olsson/Lina Andersson) at 20.0 (3)  (Marianna Longa/Arianna Follis) 23.8
Saarinen wins her second title and third medal of the championships.
1.6 km Classic Team Sprint men: (1)  (Johan Kjølstad/Ola Vigen Hattestad) 22mins 48.5secs (2)  (Tobias Angerer/Axel Teichmann) at 0.5 (3)  (Ville Nousiainen/Sami Jauhojärvi) 0.5
Hattestad wins a second title a day after he won the individual sprint.

Figure skating
World Junior Championships in Sofia, Bulgaria:
Pairs: (1) Lubov Iliushechkina/Nodari Maisuradze  144.32 (2) Anastasia Martiusheva/Alexei Rogonov  138.59 (3) Marissa Castelli/Simon Shnapir  137.47

24 February 2009 (Tuesday)

Cricket
Sri Lanka in Pakistan:
1st Test in Karachi, day 4:
 644/7d;  574/5 (Younis Khan 306*). Pakistan trail by 70 runs with 5 wickets remaining in the first innings. The Test sees two historic milestones:
 For the first time in Test history, both captains (Younis and Mahela Jayawardene) hit innings of 200 or more.
 The three double centuries so far in the match tie a Test record set in 1965 by the West Indies and Australia.

Football (soccer)
Champions League First knockout round, first leg:
Atlético Madrid  2–2  Porto
Lyon  1–1  Barcelona
Arsenal  1–0  Roma
Internazionale  0–0  Manchester United
Copa Libertadores group stage:
Group 2:
Deportivo Cuenca  4–0  Guaraní
Group 4:
Independiente Medellín  0–0  Defensor Sporting
CONCACAF Champions League Quarterfinals, first leg:
Houston Dynamo  1–1  Atlante

Winter sports

Cross-country skiing
Nordic World Ski Championships in Liberec, Czech Republic:
1.3 km Freestyle Sprint women: (1) Arianna Follis  (2) Kikkan Randall  (3) Pirjo Muranen 
1.6 km Freestyle Sprint men: (1) Ola Vigen Hattestad  (2) Johan Kjølstad  (3) Nikolay Morilov

Freestyle skiing
World Cup in Branäs, Sweden:
Skicross men: (1) Lars Lewen  (2) Christopher Delbosco  (3) Michael Schmid 
Skicross women: (1) Ophelie David  (2) Karin Huttary  (3) Ashleigh Mcivor

23 February 2009 (Monday)

Cricket
Sri Lanka in Pakistan:
1st Test in Karachi, day 3:
 644/7d;  296/3 (Younis Khan 149*). Pakistan trail by 348 runs with 7 wickets remaining in the first innings.

22 February 2009 (Sunday)

Auto racing
Sprint Cup Series:
Auto Club 500 in Fontana, California:
(1) Matt Kenseth  (2) Jeff Gordon  (3) Kyle Busch 
Kenseth, who won the Daytona 500 last week, becomes the first driver to win the first two races of a Cup season since Gordon in 1997.
A1 Grand Prix:
Grand Prix of Nations, South Africa in Midrand, South Africa:
Sprint Race: (1) Netherlands (Jeroen Bleekemolen)  (2) Portugal (Filipe Albuquerque)  (3) Switzerland (Neel Jani) 
Feature Race: (1) Switzerland  (2) Brazil (Felipe Guimarães)  (3) Monaco (Clivio Piccione) 
Standings: (1) Switzerland  73 (2) Ireland  70 (3) Portugal  64

Basketball
Greek Cup Final in Ellinikon:
Olympiacos 70–80 Panathinaikos
Italian Cup Final in Casalecchio di Reno:
Montepaschi Siena 70–69 Virtus Bologna
Spanish Cup Final in Madrid:
TAU Cerámica 100–98 (OT) Unicaja Málaga
French Cup Final in Le Havre:
Orléans 64–74 Le Mans
Turkish Cup Final in İzmir:
Efes Pilsen 79–70 Erdemirspor

Cricket
Sri Lanka in Pakistan:
1st Test in Karachi, day 2:
 644/7d (Mahela Jayawardene 240, Thilan Samaraweera 231);  44/1. Pakistan trail by 600 runs with 9 wickets remaining in the first innings.
Jayawardene and Samaraweera put on a stand of 437 for the fourth wicket – breaking the world record of 411 set in May 1957 by England's Peter May and Colin Cowdrey. The 437 stand is also the eighth-highest recorded stand in the history of Test cricket, and is the fourth-highest stand in Sri Lankan history.

Golf
PGA Tour:
Northern Trust Open in Pacific Palisades, California:
Winner: Phil Mickelson  269 (−15)
Mickelson successfully defends his title from last year.
European Tour:
Johnnie Walker Classic in Perth, Australia:
Winner: Danny Lee (am)  271 (−17)
Lee becomes the youngest winner in European Tour history, aged 18 years and 213 days – breaking the record of Dale Hayes, who was 77 days older when he won the 1971 Dutch Open. As Lee is an amateur, he is not entitled to the prize money of $304,286.

Snooker
Welsh Open in Newport, United Kingdom:
Final: Ali Carter  9–5  Joe Swail

Tennis
ATP Tour:
Open 13 in Marseille, France:
Final:  Jo-Wilfried Tsonga  def.  Michaël Llodra, 7–5, 7–6(3)
Tsonga wins his second title in three weeks.
Copa Telmex in Buenos Aires, Argentina:
Final:  Tommy Robredo def.  Juan Mónaco, 7–5, 2–6, 7–6(5)
Robredo wins a title for the second consecutive week.
Regions Morgan Keegan Championships and the Cellular South Cup in Memphis, Tennessee, United States:
Final:  Andy Roddick def.  Radek Štěpánek, 7–5, 7–5
WTA Tour:
Copa Colsanitas in Bogotá, Colombia:
Final:  María José Martínez Sánchez def.  Gisela Dulko, 6–3, 6–2
Martínez wins the first WTA title of her career.

Winter sports

Alpine skiing
Women's World Cup in Tarvisio, Italy:
Super giant slalom: (1) Lindsey Vonn  1min 21.72sec (2) Fabienne Suter  1:22.23 (3) Tina Maze  1:22.39
Overall World Cup standings (after 25 of 34 events): (1) Vonn 1374 points (2) Maria Riesch  1075 (3) Anja Pärson  960
Men's World Cup in Sestriere, Italy:
Super combined: (1) Romed Baumann  2:25.73 (2) Julien Lizeroux  2:26.05 (3) Carlo Janka  & Christof Innerhofer  2:26.41
Overall World Cup standings (after 29 of 38 events): (1) Ivica Kostelic  802 points (2) Jean-Baptiste Grange  771 (3) Benjamin Raich  769
Final Combined World Cup standings: (1) Janka 242 points (2) Silvan Zurbriggen  231 (3) Baumann 169

Biathlon
World Championships in Pyeongchang, South Korea:
Women's 12.5 km Mass Start: (1) Olga Zaitseva  34:18.3 (2) (2) Anastasiya Kuzmina  at 7.5 sec (2) (3) Helena Jonsson  12.3 (2)
Overall World Cup standings (after 18 out of 26 races): (1) Kati Wilhelm  729 points (2) Jonsson 703 (3) Magdalena Neuner  626
Men's 4 x 7.5 km Relay: (1)  (Emil Hegle Svendsen, Lars Berger, Halvard Hanevold, Ole Einar Bjørndalen) 1:08:04.1 (11) (2)  (Daniel Mesotitsch, Simon Eder, Dominik Landertinger, Christoph Sumann) 1:08:16.7 (7) (3)  (Michael Rösch, Christoph Stephan, Arnd Peiffer, Michael Greis) 1:08:36.8 (10)
Bjørndalen wins his fourth title of the championships.
World Cup Relay standings (after 5 of 6 races): (1) Austria 276 points (2) Norway 249 (3) Germany 231

Bobsleigh
World Championships at Lake Placid, New York, United States:
Two-man: (1)  (Ivo Rüegg, Cedric Grand) 3:42.20 (2)  (Thomas Florschütz, Marc Kühne) +0.22 (3) USA (Steven Holcomb, Curtis Tomasevicz) +0.40

Bobsleigh and Skeleton
World Championships at Lake Placid, New York, United States:
Team: (1)  (Frank Rommel, Sandra Kiriasis, Patricia Polifka, Marion Trott, Thomas Florschütz & Andreas Barucha) 3:45.41 (2)  (Gregor Stähli, Sabrina Hafner, Anne Dietrich, Maya Pedersen, Ivo Rüegg & Cedric Grand) +0.24 (3) USA (Eric Bernotas, Shauna Rohbock, Valerie Fleming, Katie Uhlaender, Steven Holcomb & Justin Olsen) +0.25

Cross-country skiing
Nordic World Ski Championships in Liberec, Czech Republic:
30 km Pursuit men: (1) Petter Northug  1hour 15:52.4 (2) Anders Södergren  at 3.1sec (3) Giorgio Di Centa  11.9

Nordic combined
Nordic World Ski Championships in Liberec, Czech Republic:
Gundersen HS100/10.0 km men: (1) Todd Lodwick  24mins 22.3 (1) (2) Jan Schmid  at 13.0 (2) (3) Bill Demong  33.5 (12)
Lodwick wins his second title of the championships.

Snowboarding
World Cup in Stoneham, Canada:
Parallel GS men: (1) Benjamin Karl  (2) Siegfried Grabner  (3) Andreas Prommegger 
Parallel GS women: (1) Amelie Kober  (2) Tomoka Takeuchi  (3) Doris Günther

21 February 2009 (Saturday)

Auto racing
Nationwide Series:
Stater Brothers 300 in Fontana, California
(1) Kyle Busch  (2) Kevin Harvick  (3) Joey Logano 
Busch, who won the San Bernardino County 200 in the Truck Series earlier today, becomes the first driver in NASCAR history to win races in two national touring series on the same day.

Basketball
21 Feb:
Russian Cup Final:
Dynamo Moscow 60–81 UNICS Kazan

Cricket
Sri Lanka in Pakistan:
1st Test in Karachi, day 1:
 406/3 (Mahela Jayawardene 136 *, Thilan Samaraweera 130*)

Tennis
WTA Tour:
Dubai Tennis Championships in Dubai, United Arab Emirates:
Final:  Venus Williams beat  Virginie Razzano 6–4, 6–2
Venus Williams wins the 40th title of her career.
Regions Morgan Keegan Championships and the Cellular South Cup in Memphis, Tennessee, United States:
Final:  Victoria Azarenka beat  Caroline Wozniacki 6–3, 6–1

Winter sports

Alpine skiing
Women's World Cup in Tarvisio, Italy:
downhill: (1) Gina Stechert  1:59.94 (2) Lindsey Vonn (USA) 1:59.95 (3) Anja Pärson  2:00.33
Overall World Cup standings (after 24 of 34 races): (1) Vonn 1274 points (2) Maria Riesch  1061 (3) Pärson 960
Men's World Cup in Sestriere, Italy:
Giant slalom: (1) Didier Cuche  2:49.57 (1:22.76 + 1:26.81) (2) Stephan Goergl  2:50.23 (1:24.04 + 1:26.19) (3) Benjamin Raich  2:50.46 (1:23.73 + 1:26.73)
Overall World Cup standings (after 28 of 38 races): (1) Ivica Kostelic  766 points (2) Benjamin Raich  740 (3) Jean-Baptiste Grange  726

Biathlon
World Championships in Pyeongchang, South Korea:
Men's 15 km Mass start: (1) Dominik Landertinger  38min 32.5sec (3) (2) Christoph Sumann  at 8.9 (3) (3) Ivan Tcherezov  13.9 (2)
Overall World Cup standings (after 18 of 26 events): (1) Tomasz Sikora  696 points (2) Ole Einar Bjørndalen  673 (3) Maxim Tchoudov  609
Women's 4 x 6 km Relay: (1)  (Svetlana Sleptsova, Anna Boulygina, Olga Medvedtseva, Olga Zaitseva) 1hr 13min 12.9sec (0) (2)  (Martina Beck, Magdalena Neuner, Andrea Henkel, Kati Wilhelm) at 1:15.1 (3) (3)  (Marie-Laure Brunet, Sylvie Becaert, Marie Dorin, Sandrine Bailly) 1:27.5 (1)
World Cup Relay standings (after 5 of 6 events): (1)  276 points (2)  242 (3)  208

Bobsleigh
World Championships at Lake Placid, New York, United States:
Two-woman: (1)  (Nicole Minichiello, Gillian Cooke) 3:48.22 (2) USA (Shauna Rohbock, Elana Meyers) +0.38 (3)  (Cathleen Martini, Janine Tischer) +0.62

Cross-country skiing
Nordic World Ski Championships in Liberec, Czech Republic:
15 km Pursuit women: (1) Justyna Kowalczyk  40:55.3 (2) Kristin Stoermer Steira  at 1.7 (3) Aino-Kaisa Saarinen  8.0

Luge
World Cup 9 in Whistler, British Columbia, Canada:
Men: (1) David Möller  1:33.919 (2) Armin Zöggeler  1:33.938 (3) Felix Loch  1:34.028
Final World Cup standings: (1) Zöggeler 786 points (2) Möller 659 (3) Jan Eichhorn  506

Ski jumping
Nordic World Ski Championships in Liberec, Czech Republic:
HS100 men: (1) Wolfgang Loitzl  282.0 points (103.5/99.0m) (2) Gregor Schlierenzauer  275.0 (102.0/99.0) (3) Simon Ammann  274.5 (102.0/99.5)

Snowboarding
World Cup in Stoneham, Canada:
Big air men: (1) Stefan Gimpl  (2) Marko Grilc  (3) Seppe Smits

20 February 2009 (Friday)

Winter sports

Alpine skiing
Women's World Cup in Tarvisio, Italy:
Super combined: (1) Maria Riesch  2:18.57 (1:31.98 + 46.59) (2) Lindsey Vonn  2:19.06 (1:31.22 + 47.84) (3) Kathrin Zettel  2:20.60 (1:33.57 + 47.03)
World Cup overall standings (after 23 from 34 races): (1) Vonn 1194 points (2) Riesch 1035 (3) Anja Pärson  900
Final super-combined standings: (1) Pärson 205 points (2) Vonn 180 (3) Zettel 162

Cross-country skiing
Nordic World Ski Championships in Liberec, Czech Republic:
15 km Classic men: (1) Andrus Veerpalu  38min 54.4sec (2) Lukáš Bauer  at 6.3s (3) Matti Heikkinen  16.4

Freestyle skiing
World Cup in Myrkdalen–Voss, Norway:
Moguls men: (1) Alexandre Bilodeau  26.63 (2) Tapio Luusua  25.99 (3) Michael Morse  25.86
Moguls women: (1) Aiko Uemura  27.12 (2) Nikola Sudova  25.37 (3) Miki Ito  24.78

Luge
World Cup 9 in Whistler, British Columbia, Canada:
Women: (1) Natalie Geisenberger  1:38.012 (49.020+48.992) (2) Tatjana Hüfner  1:38.369 (49.122+49.247) (3) Anke Wischnewski  1:38.612 (49.338+49.274)
Final World Cup standings: (1) Hüfner 855 points (2) Geisenberger 785 (3) Wischnewski 592
Doubles: (1) André Florschütz/Torsten Wustlich  1:37.584 (2) Patric Leitner/Alexander Resch  1:37.624 (3) Andreas Linger/Wolfgang Linger  1:37.731
Final World Cup standings: (1) Christian Oberstolz/Patrick Gruber  735 points (2) Leitner/Resch 629 (3) Linger/Linger 590

Nordic combined
Nordic World Ski Championships in Liberec, Czech Republic:
Mass Start HS100/10.0 km men: (1) Todd Lodwick  276.0 points (1) (2) Tino Edelmann  273.7 (2) (3) Jason Lamy Chappuis  265.2 (20)

Ski jumping
Nordic World Ski Championships in Liberec, Czech Republic:
HS100 women: (1) Lindsey Van  243.0 points (89.0/97.5m) (2) Ulrike Graessler  239.0 (93.5/93.0) (3) Anette Sagen  238.5 (93.5/94.0)

Snowboarding
World Cup in Stoneham, Canada:
Halfpipe men: (1) Jeff Batchelor  (2) Brad Martin  (3) Markus Malin 
Halfpipe women: (1) Soko Yamaoka  (2) Shiho Makashima  (3) Rana Okada

19 February 2009 (Thursday)

Basketball
Israeli State Cup Final in Tel Aviv:
Hapoel Holon 69–68 Maccabi Haifa
Brian Tolbert scores a three-pointer as time expires to give Holon its first Cup in history.

Cricket
England in West Indies:
3rd Test in St John's, Antigua, day 5:
 566/9d and 221/8d;  285 and 370/9 (Ramnaresh Sarwan 106). Match drawn, West Indies lead 5-match series 1–0.

Football (soccer)
UEFA Cup Round of 32, first leg:
Lech Poznań  2–2  Udinese
Shakhtar Donetsk  2–0  Tottenham Hotspur
Copenhagen  2–2  Manchester City
Marseille  0–1  Twente
Fiorentina  0–1  Ajax
Copa Libertadores group stage:
Group 5:
Cruzeiro  3–0  Estudiantes
Group 8:
Universitario  1–0  San Lorenzo

Golf
 Tiger Woods announces that his first event since knee surgery after the 2008 U.S. Open will be next week's Accenture Match Play Championship. (ESPN)

Winter sports

Biathlon
World Championships in Pyeongchang, South Korea:
Mixed Relay: (1)  (Marie-Laure Brunet, Sylvie Becaert, Vincent Defrasne, Simon Fourcade) 1:10:30.0 (6) (2)  (Helena Jonsson, Anna Carin Olofsson, David Ekholm, Carl Johan Bergman) at 1:10:36.2 (3) (3)  (Andrea Henkel, Simone Hauswald, Arnd Peiffer, Michael Greis) 1:10:39.0 (11)

Cross-country skiing
Nordic World Ski Championships in Liberec, Czech Republic:
10 km Classic women: (1) Aino-Kaisa Saarinen  28mins 12.8secs (2) Marianna Longa  at 4.2 (3) Justyna Kowalczyk  11.5

Freestyle skiing
World Cup in Myrkdalen–Voss, Norway:
Skicross men: (1) Tomas Kraus  (2) Thomas Zangerl  (3) Andreas Matt 
Skicross women: (1) Ophelie David  (2) Katharina Gutensohn  (3) Karin Huttary

Nordic combined
Nordic World Ski Championships in Liberec, Czech Republic:
Mass Start HS100/10.0 km men: Ski jumping postponed to Friday

Snowboarding
World Cup in Stoneham, Canada:
Snowboardcross men: (1) Markus Schairer  (2) Jonathan Cheever  (3) Seth Wescott 
Snowboardcross women: (1) Lindsey Jacobellis  (2) Mellie Francon  (3) Maëlle Ricker

18 February 2009 (Wednesday)

Cricket
England in West Indies:
3rd Test in St John's, Antigua, day 4:
 566/9d and 221/8d;  285 and 143/3. West Indies require another 360 runs with 7 wickets remaining.

Football (soccer)
UEFA Cup Round of 32, first leg:
Olympiacos  1–3  Saint-Étienne
Zenit St. Petersburg  2–1  Stuttgart
Dynamo Kyiv  1–1  Valencia
Aston Villa  1–1  CSKA Moscow
Werder Bremen  1–1  Milan
Sampdoria  0–1  Metalist Kharkiv
N.E.C. Nijmegen  0–3  Hamburg
Paris Saint-Germain  2–0  Wolfsburg
Bordeaux  0–0  Galatasaray
Aalborg BK  3–0  Deportivo
Braga  3–0  Standard Liège
Copa Libertadores group stage:
Group 1:
Colo-Colo  1–2  Sport Recife
Group 3:
Nacional  0–3  Nacional
Group 4:
São Paulo  1–1  Independiente Medellín

Winter sports

Biathlon
World Championships in Pyeongchang, South Korea:
Women's 15 km Individual: (1) Kati Wilhelm  44:03.1 (1) (2) Teja Gregorin  at 39.5 sec (1) (3) Tora Berger  46.5 (1)
Wilhelm wins her second title and third medal of the championships.
Overall World Cup standings after 17 out of 26 races: (1) Wilhelm 718 points (2) Helena Jonsson  655 (3) Magdalena Neuner  590

17 February 2009 (Tuesday)

Cricket
England in West Indies:
3rd Test in St John's, Antigua, day 3:
 566/9d and 31/1;  285. England led by 312 runs with 9 wickets remaining.

Football (soccer)
Copa Libertadores group stage:
Group 1:
LDU Quito  3–2  Palmeiras
Group 2:
Boca Juniors  1–0  Deportivo Cuenca
Group 6:
Everton  1–0  Caracas

Winter sports

Biathlon
World Championships in Pyeongchang, South Korea:
Men's 20 km Individual: (1) Ole Einar Bjørndalen  52:28.0 (0+0+2+1) (2) Christoph Stephan  52:42.1 (1+0+0+0) (3) Jakov Fak  52:45.1 (0+0+0+1)
Bjørndalen wins his third title of the championships, the 13th World Championship title of his career, and also wins his 87th World Cup race, and breaks the record held by Ingemar Stenmark.
World Cup overall standings after 17 out of 26 competitions: (1) Tomasz Sikora  658 points (2) Bjørndalen 630 (3) Maxim Tchoudov  573

16 February 2009 (Monday)

Cricket
England in West Indies:
3rd Test in St John's, Antigua, day 2:
 566/9d (Andrew Strauss 169, Paul Collingwood 113);  55/1. West Indies trail by 511 runs with 9 wickets remaining in the first innings.

Golf
PGA Tour:
AT&T Pebble Beach National Pro-Am in Pebble Beach, California
Winner: Dustin Johnson  201 (−15). Tournament suspended after 54 holes due to unplayable course conditions.

15 February 2009 (Sunday)

Auto racing
Sprint Cup Series:
Daytona 500 in Daytona Beach, Florida:
(1) Matt Kenseth  (2) Kevin Harvick  (3) A. J. Allmendinger 
Race cut to  due to rain.
World Rally Championship:
Rally Norway:
(1) Sébastien Loeb  Citroën C4 3:28:15.9 (2) Mikko Hirvonen  Ford Focus 3:28:25.7 (3) Jari Matti Latvala  Ford Focus 3:29:37.7
Drivers overall standings: (1) Loeb 20 pts (2) Hirvonen 14 (3) Dani Sordo  12

Basketball
NBA All-Star Game in Phoenix, Arizona:
West 146, East 119.
The MVP Award is shared by Los Angeles Lakers' Kobe Bryant and Phoenix Suns' Shaquille O'Neal, each winning the award for the third time.

Cricket
England in West Indies:
3rd Test in St John's, Antigua, day 1:
 301/3 (Andrew Strauss 169)
New Zealand in Australia:
Only T20I in Sydney:
 150/7 (20/20 ov);  149/5 (20/20 ov). Australia win by 1 run.

Golf
PGA Tour:
AT&T Pebble Beach National Pro-Am in Pebble Beach, California
 Final round postponed until Monday due to severe weather.
European Tour:
Malaysian Open in Kuala Lumpur, Malaysia:
Winner: Anthony Kang  271 (−17)

Rugby union
Six Nations Championship, week 2:
 9–38 Ireland in Rome
Ireland top the table on 4 points from 2 matches, ahead of Wales on scoring differential.
Sevens World Series:
USA Sevens in San Diego:
Final:  14–19 
Standings after 4 of 8 events: (1)  &  60 pts (3)  52

Tennis
ATP Tour:
SAP Open in San Jose, California, United States:
Final:  Radek Štěpánek def.  Mardy Fish 3–6, 6–4, 6–2
ABN AMRO World Tennis Tournament in Rotterdam, Netherlands:
Final:  Andy Murray def.  Rafael Nadal 6–3, 4–6, 6–0
WTA Tour:
Open Gaz de France in Paris, France:
Final:  Amélie Mauresmo def.  Elena Dementieva 7–6(7), 2–6, 6–4
Pattaya Women's Open in Pattaya, Thailand:
Final:  Vera Zvonareva def.  Sania Mirza 7–5, 6–1

Winter sports

Alpine skiing
World Championships in Val d'Isère, France:
Men's Slalom: (1) Manfred Pranger  1:44.17 (52.49 + 51.68) (2) Julien Lizeroux  1:44.48 (52.98 + 51.50) (3) Michael Janyk  1:45.70 (54.37 + 51.33)

Biathlon
World Championships in Pyeongchang, South Korea:
Women's 10 km Pursuit: (1) Helena Jonsson  34:12.3 (2) (2) Kati Wilhelm  at 18.3sec (6) (3) Olga Zaitseva  24.1 (6)
Overall World Cup standings (after 16 out of 26 races): (1) Wilhelm 658 points (2) Jonsson 621 (3) Magdalena Neuner  590
Men's 12.5 km Pursuit: (1) Ole Einar Bjørndalen  31:46.7 (4) (2) Maxim Tchoudov  at 41.7 sec (3) (3) Alexander Os  52.8 (3)
Bjørndalen wins his second gold medal of the championship and a record twelfth World Championship title.
Overall World Cup standings (after 16 out of 26 races): (1) Tomasz Sikora  626 points (2) Bjørndalen 570 (3) Emil Hegle Svendsen  570

Nordic combined
World Cup in Klingenthal, Germany:
10 km Gundersen: (1) Bill Demong  27mins 04.4secs (7) (2) Jason Lamy-Chappuis  at 0.6 (2) (3) Pavel Churavy  1.7 (1)
Overall World Cup rankings (after 19 of the 23 races): (1) Anssi Koivuranta  1169 points (2) Magnus Moan  1120 (3) Bjoern Kircheisen  840

Short track speed skating
World Cup 6 in Dresden, Germany

Ski jumping
World Cup in Oberstdorf, Germany:
213m flying hill team: (1)  1413.8 (Kalle Keituri/Juha-Matti Ruuskanen/Matti Hautamäki/Harri Olli) (2)  1378.3 (Denis Kornilov/Pavel Karelin/Ilja Rosliakov/Dimitry Vassiliev) (3)  1354.3 (Wolfgang Loitzl/Markus Eggenhofer/Andreas Kofler/Martin Koch)

Snowboarding
World Cup in Cypress Mountain, Canada:
Parallel GS men: Cencelled
Parallel GS women: Cancelled

Speed skating
World Cup 8 in Heerenveen, Netherlands:
Men 1500 m: (1) Shani Davis  1:45.40 (2) Enrico Fabris  1:45.88 (3) Trevor Marsicano  1:46.09
Men 10000 m: (1) Sven Kramer  13:03.51 (2) Håvard Bøkko  13:07.93 (3) Bob de Jong  13:09.16
Women 5000 m: (1) Martina Sáblíková  6:59.08 (2) Stephanie Beckert  7:01.33 (3) Kristina Groves  7:05.08
Women 1500 m: (1) Anni Friesinger  1:57.48 (2) Christine Nesbitt  1:57.58 (3) Kristina Groves  1:58.40

14 February 2009 (Saturday)

Auto racing
Nationwide Series:
Camping World 300 in Daytona Beach, Florida
(1) Tony Stewart

Basketball
NBA All-Star Saturday Night
Slam Dunk Contest: Nate Robinson of the New York Knicks reclaims the championship after beating defending champion Orlando Magic's Dwight Howard garnering 52% of the fan vote. Robinson's dunk include jumping over Howard's shoulder, while Howard dunked on an 11-foot basket.
Three-Point Shootout: Daequan Cook of the Miami Heat forced overtime and won on the extra shootout against Rashard Lewis of the Orlando Magic. Cook converted his last 4 shots to tie Lewis; in the extra shootout, Lewis got cold as he tallied only 7 points against Cook's 19.
Skills Challenge: Chicago Bull Derrick Rose dunked on the final stunt to clinch the Skills Challenge championship over Devin Harris of the New Jersey Nets.
Shooting Stars Competition: Team Detroit won over Team Phoenix

Golf
LPGA Tour:
SBS Open at Turtle Bay in Kahuku, Hawaii
Winner: Angela Stanford  206 (−10)

Rugby union
Six Nations Championship, week 2:
 22–13  in Paris
 23–15  in Cardiff
Wales lead the standings with 4 points from 2 matches.

Tennis
ATP Tour:
Brasil Open in Costa do Sauípe, Brazil
Final:  Tommy Robredo beat  Thomaz Bellucci 6–3, 3–6, 6–4

Winter sports

Alpine skiing
World Championships in Val d'Isère, France:
Women's Slalom: (1) Maria Riesch  1:51.80 (55.63 + 56.17) (2) Šárka Záhrobská  1:52.57 (55.47 + 57.10) (3) Tanja Poutiainen  1:52.89 (55.91 + 56.98)

Biathlon
World Championships in Pyeongchang, South Korea:
Women's 7.5 km sprint: (1) Kati Wilhelm  21:11.1 (0 penalty) (2) Simone Hauswald  at 9.9 (0) (3) Olga Zaitseva  27.1 (0)
Overall World Cup standings after 15 out of 26 races: (1) Wilhelm 604 points (2) Helena Jonsson  561 (3) Magdalena Neuner  560
Men's 10 km sprint: (1) Ole Einar Bjørndalen  24:16.5 (2 penalties) (2) Lars Berger  at 1.2 (2) (3) Halvard Hanevold  12.5 (0)
World Cup overall standings after 15 out of 26 races: (1) Tomasz Sikora  583 points (2) Emil Hegle Svendsen  570 (3) Bjørndalen 510

Bobsleigh
World Cup 8 in Park City, Utah, United States:
Four-man: (1) Steven Holcomb/Justin Olsen/Steve Mesler/Curtis Tomasevicz  1:34.80 (2) Janis Minins/Daumants Dreiskens/Oskars Melbardis/Intars Dambis  1:35.35 (3) Alexandr Zubkov/Roman Oreshnikov/Dmitry Trunenkov/Dmitriy Stepushkin  1:35.57
Final World Cup standings: (1) Zubkov 1646 (2) Minins 1549 (3) Andre Lange  1251

Cross-country skiing
World Cup in Valdidentro, Italy:
Men's 15 km classic: (1) Anders Södergren  37:58.0 (2) Jens Arne Svartedal  at 1.9 (3) Johan Olsson  2.2
Overall World Cup standings (after 23 of 32 races): (1) Dario Cologna  939 points (2) Petter Northug  736 (3) Axel Teichmann (GER) 663
Women's 10 km classic: (1) Justyna Kowalczyk  29:37.4 (2) Marianna Longa  at 12.4 (3) Petra Majdič  30.3
Overall World Cup standings (after 22 of 32 races): (1) Aino-Kaisa Saarinen  1276 points (2) Majdic 1250 (3) Kowalczyk 1167

Freestyle skiing
World Cup in Åre, Sweden:
Dual Moguls men: (1) Alexandre Bilodeau  (2) Guilbaut Colas  (3) Maxime Gingras 
Dual Moguls women: (1) Hannah Kearney  (2) Aiko Uemura  (3) Margarita Marbler 
World Cup in Moscow, Russia:
Aerials men: (1) Ryan St Onge  249.94 (2) Dmitri Dashinski  247.86 (3) Stanislav Kravchuk  243.64
Aerials women: (1) Xu Mengtao  195.98 (2) Cheng Shuang  192.81 (3) Lydia Lassila  192.11

Luge
World Cup 8 in Calgary, Canada
Men: (1) Armin Zöggeler  1:30.375 (2) Felix Loch  1:30.690 (3) Albert Demtschenko  1:30.796
World Cup standings (after 8 of 9 races): (1) Zöggeler 701 points (2) David Möller  559 (3) Jan Eichhorn  460
Zöggeler secures his eighth World Cup title.
Doubles: (1) Christian Oberstolz/Patrick Gruber  (2) Peter Penz/Georg Fischler  (3) Gerhard Plankensteiner/Oswald Haselrieder 
World Cup standings (after 8 of 9 races): (1) Oberstolz/Gruber 680 points (2) Patric Leitner/Alexander Resch  544 (3) Andreas Linger/Wolfgang Linger  520
Oberstolz/Gruber secure their second World Cup title.

Nordic combined
World Cup in Klingenthal, Germany:
10 km Gundersen: (1) Anssi Koivuranta  27:16.7 (2) Magnus Moan  27:32.1 (3) Jan Schmid  28:20.8
World Cup standings (after 18 of 23 events): (1) Koivuranta 1133 points (2) Moan 1070 (3) Björn Kircheisen  840

Ski jumping
World Cup in Oberstdorf, Germany:
213m flying hill: (1) Harri Olli  435.8 pts (225.5/216.0 m), (2) Anders Jacobsen  428.6 (218.0/212.5), (3) Johan Remen Evensen  426.5 (211.5/223.5)
Overall World Cup standings (after 21 of 27 rounds): (1) Gregor Schlierenzauer  1652 points, (2) Simon Ammann  1418, (3) Wolfgang Loitzl  1252

Snowboarding
World Cup in Cypress Mountain, Canada:
Halfpipe men: (1) Shaun White  (2) Ryoh Aono  (3) Iouri Podladtchikov 
Halfpipe women: (1) Kelly Clark  (2) Liu Jiayu  (3) Hannah Teter

13 February 2009 (Friday)

Baseball
The City Commission of Miami, Florida, defeats a construction agreement that would have permitted the construction of Marlins Park, a new baseball stadium for the Florida Marlins, by a vote of 2–2 with one absence. The deal will be renegotiated and is rescheduled for a new meeting on 12 March.

Basketball
NBA All-Star Weekend:
Rookie Challenge: Sophomores 122, Rookies 116. Kevin Durant of the Oklahoma City Thunder won the MVP honors with a Rookie Challenge scoring record of 46 points.

Cricket
England in West Indies:
2nd Test in North Sound, Antigua, day 1:
 7/0; . Match drawn, West Indies lead 5-match series 1–0.
The match is abandoned after only ten balls being bowled due to overly sandy outfield that made bowling impossible. The series will be extended to five matches and resume on Sunday, at the nearby Antigua Recreation Ground.
New Zealand in Australia:
5th ODI in Brisbane:
 168/4 (22/22 ov);  123/6 (14/20 ov). No result, 5-match series tied 2–2.

Winter sports

Alpine skiing
World Championships in Val d'Isère, France:
Men's Giant slalom: (1) Carlo Janka  2:18.82 (1:08.25 + 1:10.57) (2) Benjamin Raich  2:19.53 (1:08.73 + 1:10.80) (3) Ted Ligety  2:19.81 (1:09.96 + 1:09.85)

Bobsleigh
World Cup 8 in Park City, Utah, United States:
Four-man: (1) Steven Holcomb/Justin Olsen/Steve Mesler/Curtis Tomasevicz  1:34.34 (47.03/47.31) (2) Janis Minins/Daumants Dreiškens/Oskars Melbardis/Intars Dambis  1:34.57 (47.28/47.29) (3) Alexandr Zubkov/Roman Oreshnikov/Dmitry Trunenkov/Dmitriy Stepushkin  1:34.68 (47.26/47.42)
World Cup standings (after 7 of 8 races): (1) Zoubkov 1446 pts (2) Miņins 1339 (3) Wolfgang Stampfer  1136
Two-woman: (1) Cathleen Martini/Janine Tischer  1:38.66 (49.28/49.38) (2) Kaillie Humphries/Shelley-Ann Brown  1:38.84 (49.30/49.54) (3) Sandra Kiriasis/Patricia Polifka  1:39.34 (49.67/49.67)
Final World Cup standings: (1) Kiriasis 1679 pts (2) Martini 1599 (3) Nicole Minichiello  1434
Kiriasis wins her sixth straight World Cup title.

Cross-country skiing
World Cup in Valdidentro, Italy:
Men's sprint freestyle: (1) Ola Vigen Hattestad  (2) Alexei Petukhov  (3) Emil Joensson 
Overall World Cup standings (after 22 of 32 events): (1) Dario Cologna  926 points (2) Petter Northug  720 (3) Axel Teichmann  649
Women's sprint freestyle: (1) Petra Majdič  (2) Pirjo Muranen  (3) Magda Genuin 
Overall World Cup standings (after 22 of 32 events): (1) Aino-Kaisa Saarinen  1240 points (2) Majdic 1190 (3) Virpi Kuitunen  1069

Freestyle skiing
World Cup in Åre, Sweden:
Moguls men: (1) Alexandre Bilodeau  26.11 (2) Pierre-Alexandre Rousseau  25.96 (3) Vincent Marquiz  25.44
Moguls women: (1) Margarita Marbler  24.89 (2) Jennifer Heil  24.74 (3) Aiko Uemura  24.66

Luge
World Cup 8 in Calgary, Canada
Women: (1) Tatjana Hüfner  (2) Natalie Geisenberger  (3) Veronika Halder 
World Cup standings (after 8 of 9 races): (1) Hüfner 770 points (2) Geisenberger 685 (3) Anke Wischnewski  522

Snowboarding
World Cup in Cypress Mountain, Canada:
Snowboardcross men: (1) Markus Schairer  (2) Mike Robertson  (3) Seth Wescott 
Snowboardcross women: (1) Lindsey Jacobellis  (2) Olivia Nobs  (3) Helene Olafsen

12 February 2009 (Thursday)

Auto racing
Sprint Cup Series:
Gatorade Duel in Daytona Beach, Florida
Winners: Jeff Gordon  & Kyle Busch

Basketball
Euroleague Top 16, week 3:
Group F:
Regal FC Barcelona  85–69  ALBA Berlin
Real Madrid  98–79  Maccabi Tel Aviv
Group G:
Panathinaikos  92–67  Lottomatica Roma
Group H:
Cibona Zagreb  55–65  Fenerbahçe Ülker
Real Madrid and Panathinaikos are unbeaten after 3 games.

Football (soccer)
Copa Libertadores group stage:
Group 3:
Nacional  2–1  U. San Martín
River Plate  1–0  Nacional
Group 5:
Universitario de Sucre  1–1  Deportivo Quito

Winter sports

Alpine skiing
World Championships in Val d'Isère, France:
Women's Giant slalom: (1) Kathrin Hölzl  2:03.49 (2) Tina Maze  2:03.58 (3) Tanja Poutiainen  2:04.03

Bobsleigh
World Cup 7 in Park City, Utah, United States:
Two-man: (1) Alexandre Zoubkov/Alexey Voevoda  1:36.51 (48.26/48.25) (2) Thomas Florschütz/Marc Kühne  1:36.68 (48.44/48.24) (3) Beat Hefti/Thomas Lamparter  1:36.69 (48.30/48.39)
World Cup standings (after 7 of 8 events): (1) Hefti 1581 pts (2) André Lange  1501 (3) Florschuetz 1453

Skeleton
World Cup 8 in Park City, Utah, United States:
Men: (1) Aleksandr Tretyakov  1:39.33 (49.66/49.67) (2) Florian Grassl  1:39.40 (49.83/49.57) (3) Frank Rommel  1:39.56 (49.73/49.83)
Final World Cup standings: (1) Tretyakov 1526 pts (2) Grassl 1453 (3) Rommel 1436
Women: (1) Marion Trott  1:41.28 (50.51/50.77) (2) Katie Uhlaender  1:41.59 (50.69/50.90) (3) Mellisa Hollingsworth  1:41.62 (50.89/50.73)
Final World Cup standings: (1) Trott 1572 pts (2) Shelley Rudman  1468 (3) Uhlaender 1466

11 February 2009 (Wednesday)

American football
 NFL news:
 Three-time MVP Brett Favre announces his retirement. Unlike last postseason, when he initially announced his retirement but decided to return, he filed official retirement papers with the NFL offices. (ESPN)

Basketball
Euroleague Top 16, week 3:
Group E:
Asseco Prokom Sopot  68–93  Olympiacos
TAU Cerámica  108–90  AJ Milano
Group G:
Partizan Igokea  60–59  Unicaja Málaga
Group H:
Montepaschi Siena  74–56  CSKA Moscow
PBA Philippine Cup Finals:
Talk 'N Text Tropang Texters 93, Alaska Aces 89, Talk 'N Text wins championship series, 4–3
The franchise of the Philippine Long Distance Telephone Company wins their third PBA championship and second Philippine Cup.

Football (soccer)
2010 FIFA World Cup Qualifying:
AFC (Asia) Fourth Round, matchday 5:
Group A:
 0–0 
The draw leaves both teams undefeated, with Australia on top with 10 pts, 2 ahead of Japan.
 0–1 
Bahrain gets level with Qatar in third place on 4 points, while Uzbekistan is at the bottom with just 1-point.
Group B:
 1–1 
Both teams remain unbeaten. South Korea at the top with 8 points, Iran in third place on 6 points.
 1–0 
North Korea climb to second place on 7 points, Saudi Arabia in fourth place on 4 pts.
UEFA (Europe):
Group 1:
 0–0 
Group 3:
 0–3 
Group 8:
 2–1 
Ireland gets level with Italy at the top on 10 points.
CONCACAF (North-Central America) Fourth Round, matchday 1:
 2–0 
 The Americans keep their nine-year home unbeaten streak against their continental rivals alive with a pair of goals from Michael Bradley.
 2–2 
 The Salvadorans come back from 0–2 down to earn a draw with a pair of late goals from William Romero.
 2–0 
Friendly internationals (selected):
 0–1 
 0–2 
 2–0 
Copa Libertadores group stage:
Group 6:
Lanús  1–1  Guadalajara
Group 8:
San Lorenzo  4–1  San Luis
Libertad  2–1  Universitario

Winter sports

Alpine skiing
World Championships in Val d'Isère, France:
Teams: Cancelled

Skeleton
World Cup 7 in Park City, Utah, United States:
Men: (1) Aleksandr Tretyakov  1:38.82 (49.49/49.33) (2) Eric Bernotas  1:38.85 (49.26/49.59) (3) Frank Rommel  1:38.88 (49.35/49.53)
World Cup standing (after 7 of 8 events): (1) Tretyakov 1301 pts (2) Florian Grassl  1243 (3) Rommel 1236
Women: (1) Mellisa Hollingsworth  1:41.62 (50.89/50.89) (2) Marion Trott  1:41.83 (50.94/50.89) (3) Noelle Pikus-Pace  1:41.89 (51.02/50.87)
World Cup standing (after 7 of 8 events): (1) Trott 1347 pts (2) Shelley Rudman  1308 (3) Anja Huber  1275

Ski jumping
World Cup in Klingenthal, Germany:
140m hill: (1) Gregor Schlierenzauer  261.2 points (131.5/135.0m) (2) Anders Jacobsen  260.3 (135.0/131.0) (3) Wolfgang Loitzl  257.1 (134.0/130.5)
Schlierenzauer wins sixth event in a row and tenth of the season.
Overall standings (after 20 of 27 events): (1) Schlierenzauer 1620 points (2) Simon Ammann  1368 (3) Loitzl 1242

10 February 2009 (Tuesday)

Cricket
India in Sri Lanka:
Twenty20 at Colombo:
 171/4 (20/20 ov);  174/7 (19.2/20 ov). India win by 3 wickets (with 4 balls remaining).
New Zealand in Australia:
4th ODI in Adelaide:
 244/8 (50 ov);  247/4 (48.2 ov). Australia win by 6 wickets and levels the 5-match series 2–2.

Football (soccer)
International friendly in London:
 2–0 
Copa Libertadores group stage:
Group 2:
Guaraní  1–2  Deportivo Táchira
Group 4:
Defensor Sporting  1–0  América de Cali
Group 7:
Aurora  0–3  Boyacá Chicó

9 February 2009 (Monday)

Baseball
 Alex Rodriguez admits that he used performance-enhancing drugs from 2001 to 2003. (ESPN)

Winter sports

Alpine skiing
World Championships in Val d'Isère, France:
Men's Super combined: (1) Aksel Lund Svindal  2:23.00 (1:30.99 + 52.01) (2) Julien Lizeroux  2:23.90 (1:33.92 + 49.98) (3) Natko Zrncic-Dim  2:24.58 (1:32.59 + 51.99)
Women's downhill: (1) Lindsey Vonn  1:30.31 (2) Lara Gut  1:30.83 (3) Nadia Fanchini  1:30.88
Vonn wins her second gold medal of the championships, while Gut wins a second silver.

8 February 2009 (Sunday)

American football
NFL:
Pro Bowl in Honolulu:
NFC 30, AFC 21
The Arizona Cardinals' wide receiver Larry Fitzgerald scores two touchdowns for the NFC and is named the game's MVP.

Cricket
India in Sri Lanka:
5th ODI at Colombo:
 320/8 (50 ov);  252 (48.5 ov). Sri Lanka win by 68 runs. India win 5-match series 4–1
New Zealand in Australia:
3rd ODI in Sydney:
 301/9 (50 ov);  269 (47.3 ov). Australia win by 32 runs. New Zealand lead 5-match series 2–1

Golf
PGA Tour:
Buick Invitational in La Jolla, California:
Winner: Nick Watney  277 (−11)
European Tour:
Indian Masters in Delhi, India: Cancelled

Ice hockey
Olympic men's qualifying tournament:(teams in bold qualify to 2010 Olympic tournament)
Group E in Hanover, Germany
 2–5 
 2–1 
Group F in Riga, Latvia
 3–4(SO) 
 4–1 
Group G in Oslo, Norway
 8–2 
 5–3

Rugby union
Six Nations Championship, week 1:
 13–26  in Edinburgh

Tennis
ATP Tour:
Movistar Open in Viña del Mar, Chile:
Final:  Fernando González beat  José Acasuso 6–1, 6–3
PBZ Zagreb Indoors in Zagreb, Croatia:
Final:  Marin Čilić beat  Mario Ančić 6–3, 6–4
SA Tennis Open in Johannesburg, South Africa:
Final:  Jo-Wilfried Tsonga beat  Jérémy Chardy 6–4, 7–6 (5)
Fed Cup:
World Group First Round, day 2:
 5–0  in Moscow, Russia
 0–5  in Orléans, France
 3–2  in Surprise, Arizona, United States
 4–1  in Brno, Czech Republic
In the semifinals, Italy will host Russia and Czech Republic host USA.
World Group II First Round, day 2:
 4–1  in Bratislava, Slovak Republic
 2–3  in Zürich, Switzerland
 4–1  in Belgrade, Serbia
 3–2  in Kharkiv, Ukraine

Winter sports

Alpine skiing
World Championships in Val d'Isère, France:
Women's downhill: Postponed to Monday

Luge
World Championships in Lake Placid, New York, United States:
Mixed Team Relay: (1)  (Felix Loch, Natalie Geisenberger, André Florschütz, Torsten Wustlich) 2:39.630 (2)  (Daniel Pfister, Nina Reithmeyer, Peter Penz, Georg Fischler) +1.510 (3)  (Guntis Rekis, Maija Tiruma, Andris Sics, Juris Sics) +2.869

Nordic combined
World Cup in Seefeld, Austria:
10 km Gundersen: (1) Magnus Moan  29:18.8 (2) Mario Stecher  29:22.0 (3) Anssi Koivuranta  29:52.5
World Cup standings (after 17 of 23 events): (1) Koivuranta 1033 pts (2) Moan 990 (3) Björn Kircheisen  790
Team 3x5km: cancelled

Short track speed skating
World Cup 5 in Sofia, Bulgaria:

Ski jumping
World Cup in Willingen, Germany
145m hill: (1) Gregor Schlierenzauer  267.2 points (144.0/135.0m) (2) Simon Ammann  265.2 (133.5/145.5) (3) Noriaki Kasai  261.8 (136.0/140.0)
Schlierenzauer wins fifth event in a row and ninth this season.
World Cup standings (after 19 of 27 rounds): (1) Schlierenzauer 1,520 pts (2) Ammann 1,328 (3) Wolfgang Loitzl  1,182

Speed skating
World Allround Championships in Hamar, Norway:
Men: (1) Sven Kramer  147.567 (2) Håvard Bøkko  148.077 (3) Enrico Fabris  149.469
Women: (1) Martina Sáblíková  161.616 (2) Kristina Groves  162.264 (3) Ireen Wüst  163.639

7 February 2009 (Saturday)

Auto racing
Sprint Cup Series:
Budweiser Shootout in Daytona Beach, Florida:
(1)  Kevin Harvick (2)  Jamie McMurray (3)  Tony Stewart

Baseball
Sports Illustrated reports that New York Yankees superstar Alex Rodriguez tested positive for steroids in 2003, a season when he was American League MVP with the Texas Rangers. (Sports Illustrated)

Cricket
England in West Indies:
1st Test in Kingston, Jamaica, day 4:
 318 and 51;  392. West Indies win by an innings and 23 runs, lead 4-match series 1–0.
England's 51 is their third-lowest Test innings score in history.

Ice hockey
Olympic men's qualifying tournament:
Group E in Hanover, Germany
 4–5(SO) 
 1–2 
Germany qualify to 2010 Olympic tournament
Group G in Oslo, Norway
 3–2 
 2–3

Rugby union
Six Nations Championship, week 1:
 36–11  in London
Ireland 30–21  in Dublin
Sevens World Series:
Wellington Sevens in Wellington, New Zealand:
Final:  19–17

Tennis
Fed Cup:
World Group First Round, day 1:
 2–0  in Moscow, Russia
 0–2  in Orléans, France
 1–1  in Surprise, Arizona, United States
 1–1  in Brno, Czech Republic
World Group II First Round, day 1:
 2–0  in Bratislava, Slovak Republic
 1–1  in Zürich, Switzerland
 2–0  in Belgrade, Serbia
 1–1  in Kharkiv, Ukraine

Winter sports

Alpine skiing
World Championships in Val d'Isère, France:
Men's downhill: (1) John Kucera  2:07.01 (2) Didier Cuche  2:07.05 (3) Carlo Janka  2:07.18

Bobsleigh
World Cup 7 in Whistler, British Columbia, Canada:
Four-man: (1) Jānis Miņins/Daumants Dreiškens/Oskars Melbardis/Intars Dambis  1:42.17 (50.97/51.20) (2) Steven Holcomb/Justin Olsen/Steve Mesler/Curtis Tomasevicz  1:42.23 (50.99/51.24) (3) Alexandre Zoubkov/Philippe Egorov/Petr Moiseev/Alexey Andryunin  1:42.67 (51.18/51.49)
World Cup standings (after 6 of 7 races): (1) Zoubkov 1246 pts (2) Miņins 1129 (3) Wolfgang Stampfer  984

Figure skating
Four Continents Championships in Vancouver, Canada:
Men: (1) Patrick Chan  249.19 pts (2) Evan Lysacek  237.15 (3) Takahiko Kozuka  221.76

Freestyle skiing
World Cup in Cypress Mountain, Canada:
Moguls men: (1) Alexandre Bilodeau  25.65 (2) Yugo Tsukita  25.09 (3) Guilbaut Colas  24.78
Moguls women: (1) Jennifer Heil  24.79 (2) Hannah Kearney  24.18 (3) Margarita Marbler  23.84

Luge
World Championships in Lake Placid, New York, United States:
Men: (1) Felix Loch  1:44.336 (2) Armin Zöggeler  +0.213 (3) Daniel Pfister  +0.701

Nordic combined
World Cup in Seefeld, Austria:
10 km Gundersen: (1) Mario Stecher  25:29.0 (2) Jan Schmid  25:33.8 (3) Lukas Klapfer  25:33.9
World Cup standings (after 16 of 22 events): (1) Anssi Koivuranta  973 pts (2) Magnus Moan  890 (3) Björn Kircheisen  790

Ski jumping
World Cup in Willingen, Germany
145m hill team: (1)  902.9 pts (2)  901.2 (3)  793.2

Snowboarding
World Cup in Bardonecchia, Italy:
Halfpipe men: (1) Mathieu Crepel  (2) Nathan Johnstone  (3) Iouri Podladtchikov 
Halfpipe women: (1) Kelly Clark  (2) Hannah Teter  (3) Gretchen Bleiler

6 February 2009 (Friday)

Cricket
England in West Indies:
1st Test in Kingston, Jamaica, day 3:
 318;  352/7 (Ramnaresh Sarwan 107, Chris Gayle 104). West Indies led by 34 runs with 3 wickets remaining in the first innings.
New Zealand in Australia:
2nd ODI in Melbourne:
 225/5 (50 ov);  226/4 (48.5 ov). New Zealand win by 6 wickets and lead 5-match series 2–0.

Ice hockey
Olympic men's qualifying tournament:
Group F in Riga, Latvia
 4–1 
 2–4

Winter sports

Alpine skiing
World Championships in Val d'Isère, France:
Women's Super combined: (1) Kathrin Zettel  2:20.13 (2) Lara Gut  2:20.69 (3) Elisabeth Görgl  2:21.01

Bobsleigh
World Cup 7 in Whistler, British Columbia, Canada:
Two-man: (1) Thomas Florschütz/Marc Kühne  1:43.95 (51.99/51.96) (2) Beat Hefti/Thomas Lamparter  1:44.03 (52.08/51.95) (3) Pierre Lueders/David Bissett  1:44.14 (51.98/52.16)
World Cup standings (after 7 of 8 races): (1) Hefti 1381 pts (2) André Lange  1325 (3) Florschütz 1243
Two-woman: (1) Shauna Rohbock/Elana Meyers  1:47.10 (53.57/53.53) (2) Kaillie Humphries/Heather Moyse  1:47.28 (53.62/53.66) (3) Erin Pac/Michelle Rzepka  1:47.40 (53.70/53.70)
World Cup standings (after 7 of 8 races): (1) Sandra Kiriasis  1479 pts (2) Rohbock 1380 (3) Cathleen Martini  1374

Figure skating
Four Continents Championships in Vancouver, Canada:
Ice dance: (1) Meryl Davis/Charlie White  192.39 pts (2) Tessa Virtue/Scott Moir  191.81 (3) Emily Samuelson/Evan Bates  180.79
Ladies: (1) Kim Yuna  189.07 pts (2) Joannie Rochette  183.91 (3) Mao Asada  176.52

Freestyle skiing
World Cup in Cypress Mountain, Canada:
Skicross men: (1) Christopher Delbosco  (2) Stanley Hayer  (3) Davey Barr 
Skicross women: (1) Aleisha Cline  (2) Ashleigh Mcivor  (3) Karin Huttary 
Aerials men: (1) Steve Omischl  250.96 pts (2) Anton Kushnir  250.96 (3) Stanislav Kravchuk  250.64
Aerials women: (1) Evelyne Leu  204.96 pts (2) Dai Shuangfei  192.73 (3) Cheng Shuang  182.41

Luge
World Championships in Lake Placid, New York, United States:
Women: (1) Erin Hamlin  128.098 (2) Natalie Geisenberger  +0.187 (3) Natalia Yakushenko  +0.236
Hamlin is the first ever non-European medallist in Luge World Championships, and the first non-German winner since 1993.
Doubles: (1) Gerhard Plankensteiner/Oswald Haselrieder  1:27.401 (2) Andre Florschütz/Torsten Wustlich  1:27.458 (3) Mark Grimmette/Brian Martin  1:27.611

5 February 2009 (Thursday)

Basketball
Euroleague Top 16, week 2:
Group E:
Olympiacos  73–70  TAU Cerámica
Asseco Prokom Sopot  60–62  AJ Milano
Group F:
ALBA Berlin  84–87  Real Madrid
Regal FC Barcelona  85–65  Maccabi Tel Aviv

Boxing
 Unbeaten super middleweight and light heavyweight champion Joe Calzaghe announces his retirement. (BBC Sport)

Cricket
England in West Indies:
1st Test in Kingston, Jamaica, day 2:
 318;  160/1 (Ramnaresh Sarwan 74*, Chris Gayle 71*). West Indies trail by 158 runs with 9 wickets remaining in the first innings.
India in Sri Lanka:
4th ODI at Colombo:
 332/5 (50 ov; Gautam Gambhir 150);  265 (48.0 ov). India win by 67 runs and lead 5-match series 4–0.

Ice hockey
Olympic men's qualifying tournament:
Group E in Hanover, Germany
 3–4(OT) 
 7–1 
Group F in Riga, Latvia
 2–3 
 7–3 
Group G in Oslo, Norway
 1–2(OT) 
 2–1

Winter sports

Figure skating
Four Continents Championships in Vancouver, Canada:
Ice dance (after original dance): (1) Tessa Virtue/Scott Moir  97.30 pts (2) Meryl Davis/Charlie White  95.65 (3) Emily Samuelson/Evan Bates  90.89
Pairs: (1) Pang Qing/Tong Jian  194.94 pts (2) Jessica Dubé/Bryce Davison  185.62 (3) Zhang Dan/Zhang Hao  174.98
Men's short program: (1) Patrick Chan  88.90 pts (2) Evan Lysacek  81.65 (3) Takahiko Kozuka  76.61

Skeleton
World Cup 7 in Whistler, British Columbia, Canada:
Men: (1) Jon Montgomery  1:47.67 (53.68/53.99) (2) Gregor Stähli  1:48.06 (53.69/54.37) (3) Jeff Pain  1:48.19 (53.67/54.52) & Matthew Antoine  1:48.19 (53.83/54.36)
World Cup standings (after 6 of 7 races): (1) Aleksandr Tretyakov  1076 pts (2) Florian Grassl  1067 (3) Frank Rommel  1036
Women: (1) Marion Trott  1:49.86 (54.90/54.96) (2) Amy Williams   1:50.39 (54.95/55.44) (3) Anja Huber  1:50.71 (55.26/55.45)
World Cup standings (after 6 of 7 races): (1) Shelley Rudman  1148 pts (2) Trott 1137 (3) Huber 1131

Snowboarding
World Cup in Bardonecchia, Italy:
Slopestyle men: cancelled
Slopestyle women: cancelled

4 February 2009 (Wednesday)

Basketball
Euroleague Top 16, week 2:
Group G:
Unicaja Málaga  69–81  Panathinaikos
Partizan Igokea  84–76  Lottomatica Roma
Group H:
CSKA Moscow  87–61  Cibona Zagreb
Montepaschi Siena  87–79  Fenerbahçe Ülker

Cricket
England in West Indies:
1st Test in Kingston, Jamaica, day 1:
 236/5 (Kevin Pietersen 97)
Zimbabwe in Kenya:
5th ODI in Nairobi:
 199 (48.5 ov);  203/3 (35 ov). Zimbabwe win by 7 wickets and win the series 5–0.

Winter sports

Alpine skiing
World Championships in Val d'Isère, France:
Men's Super giant slalom: (1) Didier Cuche  1:19.41 (2) Peter Fill  1:20.40 (3) Aksel Lund Svindal  1:20.43

Figure skating
Four Continents Championships in Vancouver, Canada:
Compulsory dance: (1) Tessa Virtue/Scott Moir  36.40 pts (2) Meryl Davis/Charlie White  35.23 (3) Vanessa Crone/Paul Poirier  32.43
Pairs' short program: (1) Pang Qing/Tong Jian  65.60 pts (2) Jessica Dubé/Bryce Davison  64.36 (3) Zhang Dan/Zhang Hao  63.20
Ladies' short program: (1) Kim Yuna  72.24 pts (2) Joannie Rochette  66.90 (3) Cynthia Phaneuf  60.98

3 February 2009 (Tuesday)

Cricket
India in Sri Lanka:
3rd ODI at Colombo:
 363/5 (50 ov);  216 (41.4 ov). India win by 147 runs, lead 5-match series 3–0.

Winter sports

Alpine skiing
World Championships in Val d'Isère, France:
Women's Super giant slalom: (1) Lindsey Vonn  1:20.73 (2) Marie Marchand-Arvier  1:21.07 (3) Andrea Fischbacher  1:21.13

2 February 2009 (Monday)

1 February 2009 (Sunday)

American football
NFL:
Super Bowl XLIII in Tampa, Florida:
Pittsburgh Steelers 27, Arizona Cardinals 23
The Steelers win the Vince Lombardi Trophy for a record sixth time.

Auto racing
World Rally Championship:
Rally Ireland: (1) Sébastien Loeb  Daniel Elena  Citroën C4 WRC 2:48:25.7 (2) Dani Sordo  Marc Marti  Citroën C4 WRC 2:49:53.6 (3) Mikko Hirvonen  Jarmo Lehtinen  Ford Focus RS WRC 08 2:50:33.5

Cricket
New Zealand in Australia:
1st ODI in Perth:
 181 (48.4 ov);  185/8 (50.0 ov). New Zealand win by 2 wickets in the last ball, lead 5-match series 1–0.
Zimbabwe in Kenya:
4th ODI in Nairobi:
 285/8 (50 ov);  219 (49 ov). Zimbabwe win by 66 runs, lead 5-match series 4–0.

Darts
Professional Darts Corporation:
Players Championship Finals in Purfleet, Essex:
Final:
 Phil Taylor 16–9 (legs)  Robert Thornton

Football (soccer)
UNCAF Nations Cup in Tegucigalpa, Honduras:
Final:
 0–0 
Panama win 5–3 on penalties, win first title
Third place:
 0–1

Golf
PGA Tour:
FBR Open in Scottsdale, Arizona
Winner: Kenny Perry  270 (−14)
European Tour:
Dubai Desert Classic in Dubai, United Arab Emirates
Winner: Rory McIlroy  269 (−19)

Handball
World Men's Championship in Croatia
Final:
 19–24 
France wins its third World Championship title.
Bronze Match:
 31–23

Tennis
Australian Open in Melbourne, day 14:(seeding in parentheses)
Men's singles final:
Rafael Nadal  (1) beat Roger Federer  (2) 7–5, 3–6, 7–6(3), 3–6, 6–2
Nadal wins his sixth Grand Slam title and becomes the first player who wins Grand Slams on three different surfaces within one year.
Mixed Doubles Final:
Sania Mirza /Mahesh Bhupathi  beat Nathalie Dechy /Andy Ram  6–3, 6–1

Winter sports

Alpine skiing
Men's World Cup in Garmisch-Partenkirchen, Germany:
Slalom: (1) Manfred Mölgg  1:46.77 (54.57 + 52.20) (2) Giorgio Rocca  1:47.06 (54.60 + 52.46) (3) Reinfried Herbst  1:47.37 (54.49 + 52.88)
Overall World Cup rankings (after 26 of 38 races): (1) Ivica Kostelic  742 points (2) Jean-Baptiste Grange  706 (3) Benjamin Raich  680
Slalom World Cup rankings (after eight of ten races): (1) Grange 479 points (2) Kostelic 408 (3) Herbst 376
Women's World Cup in Garmisch-Partenkirchen, Germany:
Super giant slalom: (1) Lindsey Vonn  1:22.16 (2) Anja Paerson  1:22.55 (3) Jessica Lindell-Vikarby  1:22.88
World Cup overall standings (after 22 of 34 races): (1) Vonn 1114 points (2) Maria Riesch  935 (3) Paerson 855

Cross-country skiing
World Cup in Rybinsk, Russia:
Men pursuit: cancelled
Women pursuit: cancelled

Nordic combined
World Cup in Chaux-Neuve, France:
10 km Gundersen: (1) Anssi Koivuranta  27min 29.4sec (1st) (2) Christoph Bieler  at 4.0 (3rd) (3) Magnus Moan  6.0 (27th)
Overall World Cup standings (after 15 of 22 events): (1) Koivuranta 953 points (2) Moan 861 (3) Bjorn Kircheisen  754

Ski jumping
World Cup in Sapporo, Japan:
134m hill: cancelled

Speed skating
World Cup 7 in Erfurt, Germany:
Men's 1000 m: (1) Shani Davis  1:08.40 (2) Denny Morrison  1:08.78 (3) Jan Bos  1:09.03
Women's 1000 m: (1) Anni Friesinger  1:15.61 (2) Yu Jing  1:16.41 (3) Jin Peiyu  1:16.42
Men's Team Pursuit: (1)  (Denny Morrison, Lucas Makowsky, Jay Morrison) 3:46.03 (2)  (Matteo Anesi, Enrico Fabris, Luca Stefani) 3:46.56 (3)  (Håvard Bøkko, Sverre Haugli, Stian Elvenes) 3:48.39
Final World Cup standings: (1)  310 (2)  220 (3)  210
Women's Team Pursuit: (1)  (Karolína Erbanová, Andrea Jirků, Martina Sáblíková) 3:05.32 (2)  (Galina Likhachova, Alla Shabanova, Yekaterina Shikhova) 3:05.80 (3)  (Natalia Czerwonka, Katarzyna Wojcicka, Luiza Złotkowska) 3:06.26
Final World Cup standings: (1)  235 (2) USA 205 (3)  200

References

2